Verity Beatrice Snook-Larby (born November 13, 1970) is a retired female race walker from Scotland, who also represented Great Britain during her career.  She trained at Aldershot, Farnham & District AC.

Achievements

References

1970 births
Living people
British female racewalkers
Athletes (track and field) at the 1994 Commonwealth Games
Scottish racewalkers
Commonwealth Games competitors for Scotland